Rüstsätze were field modification kits produced for the German Luftwaffe during the Second World War. They were packaged in kit form, usually direct from the aircraft manufacturer, and allowed for field modifications of various German aircraft used in World War II, predominantly fighter bombers and night fighters. Rüstsätze kits could be fitted in the field, as opposed to Umrüst-Bausätze kits, which were typically fitted in the factory. This was not a hard and fast rule, however; during production runs various Rüstsätze kits were often fitted by factories in order to meet Luftwaffe demands, and "/R" designations were also occasionally applied to more complex changes in an aircraft's airframe design that were much more suitably completed at production line facilities, as with a few of the "/R"-designated versions of the He 177A-5 heavy bomber.

Variants
Typical Rüstsätze kits would include extra cannon or machine gun armament, most often mounted in underwing gun pods, bomb and drop tank fittings, extra armor, fuel, and various electrical system upgrades. The kits were numbered R1, R2, R3 and so forth. Some of these upgrades would become almost standard on certain fighters.

The nomenclature was often confusing, as each Luftwaffe aircraft type — always defined by their RLM 8-xxx airframe number — used their own unique series of /R-series (as well as the factory fitted, Umrüst-Bausatz /U-series) numbers: the "/R2" kit for a Messerschmitt Bf 109G was for the fitment of a pair of the powerful Werfer-Granate 21 (Wfr. Gr. 21 or BR 21) underwing mounted rocket launchers, while the Focke-Wulf 190 used the "/R6" designation for this exact fitment.

The Focke-Wulf Fw 190 was well known for its various Rüstsätze, which included:

References

Citations

Bibliography

 Campbell, Jerry L. & Greer, Don (1975). Focke Wulf Fw 190 in Action. squadron/signal publications. .

External links
 The Luftwaffe Over Germany By Donald Caldwell, Richard Muller

World War II aircraft of Germany